Jason Bucknor (born March 17, 2002) is an American soccer player who plays as a forward for the University of Michigan.

Career

Fort Lauderdale CF
Bucknor made his league debut for the club on July 18, 2020, coming on as an 84th-minute substitute for Edison Azcona in a 2-0 defeat to the Greenville Triumph.

Social media 
Jason Bucknor has a TikTok account with over 100,000 followers, with an Instagram account with over 4,000 followers.

References

External links
Jason Bucknor at US Soccer Development Academy

2002 births
Living people
Inter Miami CF II players
USL League One players
American soccer players
Association football forwards
People from Weston, Florida
Soccer players from Florida
Sportspeople from Broward County, Florida
Michigan Wolverines men's soccer players